The Downshire Hospital is a 16-bed psychiatric hospital at Downpatrick, County Down, Northern Ireland, for both psychiatric intensive-care patients and low secure rehabilitation.

History
The hospital, which was designed by Henry Smyth, was opened as the Down Lunatic Asylum in 1869. It was extended in 1883, 1895 and 1904. It became the Down Mental Hospital in the 1920s and joined the National Health Service as Downshire Hospital in 1948. Following the introduction of Care in the Community in the early 1980s, the hospital went into a period of decline and provision for patients reduced from over 300 beds to just 16. Part of the building was subsequently converted for use as offices for Down District Council who began operating there in October 2012.

References

Further reading

Hospitals in County Down
Hospitals established in 1869
Psychiatric hospitals in Northern Ireland
Hospital buildings completed in 1869
Defunct hospitals in Northern Ireland
Hospitals disestablished in 2012
2012 disestablishments in Northern Ireland
19th-century architecture in Northern Ireland